Rural Rides is the book for which the English journalist, agriculturist and political reformer William Cobbett is best known.

At the time of writing in the early 1820s, Cobbett was a radical anti-Corn Law campaigner, newly returned to England from a spell of self-imposed political exile in the United States.
  
Cobbett disapproved of proposals for remedies for agricultural distress suggested in Parliament in 1821. He  made up his mind to see rural conditions for himself, and to "enforce by actual observation of rural conditions" the statements he had made in answer to the arguments of the landlords before the Parliamentary Agricultural Committee.

He embarked on a series of journeys by horseback through the countryside of Southeast England and the English Midlands. He wrote down what he saw from the points of view both of a farmer and a social reformer. The result documents the early 19th-century countryside and its people as well as giving free vent to Cobbett's opinions.

He first published his observations in serial form in the Political Register, between 1822 and 1826.  Four rides – from 1822, 1823, 1825 and 1826 – were first published in book form in two volumes in 1830. In 1853, his son James published an expanded edition, including rides from 1821, as well as his father's 1830-32 political tours to the Midlands, North and Scotland.

Editions

Penguin Classics; new edition (27 Sep 2001) .  Introduction and notes by Ian Dyck. 
Constable; abridged hardcover edition (Sep 1982) .  Introduction by E. R. Chamberlain. 
J. M. Dent & Sons; Everyman's Library (1912), reprinted 1924 and 1953, ASIN B00085HPA0. Introduction by Edward Thomas.
Rural Rides in the Counties of Surrey, Kent, Sussex, Hampshire....  Original publication by Cobbett, 1830 and 1853.

External links
 
William Cobbett - Rural Rides - UK Parliament - Living Heritage
Rural Rides, volume 1 – complete text from the Internet Archive
Rural Rides, volume 2 – complete text from the Internet Archive
 
An edited (censored) text of Rural Rides on A Vision of Britain through Time, with links to the places mentioned by Cobbett. 
Cobbett's Hampshire 1830 at Geography Department, Portsmouth University. 

Books about cultural geography
Political books
Agriculture books
1830 non-fiction books
British books
Books about England